Gilberto dos Santos Gomes (born 24 June 1959 in Mirandela, Bragança District), known simply as Gilberto, is a Portuguese retired footballer who played as a midfielder.

External links

1959 births
Living people
Portuguese footballers
Association football midfielders
Primeira Liga players
Liga Portugal 2 players
A.D. Sanjoanense players
S.C. Salgueiros players
G.D. Chaves players
Portugal international footballers
Portuguese football managers
Sportspeople from Bragança District